Donald Bertrand Tresidder (April 7, 1894 – January 28, 1948) was the fourth president of Stanford University, serving from 1943 until his sudden death in 1948. He also had a longtime association with Yosemite National Park.

Early life
Son of John Treloar Tresidder (from Cornwall), Tresidder was born in Tipton, Indiana.

Yosemite
At the age of 20 he took a trip with his sister to Southern California. The railroad tracks were washed out, so they went to Yosemite Valley instead. There he met many Stanford faculty, who convinced him to enroll in Stanford University.

On that visit to Yosemite, Tresidder met his future wife Mary Curry, daughter of David and Jennie Curry, the owners of Camp Curry. Tresidder spent his summers working in Yosemite as a porter and other odd jobs, and was briefly fired for taking his future wife rock climbing up the back side of Half Dome. They married June 17, 1920.

After graduating from Stanford he became president of Yosemite Park and Curry Company. During his tenure he presided over the construction of new roads, the Badger Pass Ski Area, and the Ahwahnee Hotel, built in 1927 and now a National Historic Landmark.

For many years, Tresidder played the role of the Squire at the Bracebridge Dinner, a lavish Christmas feast which was held every Christmas Day at the Ahwahnee Hotel in Yosemite.  His wife played the role of Lady Bracebridge.  In 1929 Tresidder asked photographer Ansel Adams to take over as director of the Dinner, which Adams agreed to do.

Stanford
Tresidder later described himself on arrival at Stanford as an undergraduate: "a gangling youth from the Midwest, wearing a jacket with sleeves too short to cover his long arms, shambling nervously up Palm Drive carrying a battered suitcase. But each student he passed waved and spoke to him cheerfully. At last he encountered President (David Starr) Jordan. The president tipped his broadbrimmed hat, bowed and greeted the young man from Indiana. Tresidder never forgot that welcome."

He earned his M.D. from Stanford Medical School in San Francisco; however, he never practiced medicine. While attending medical school he was a member of Phi Chi Medical Fraternity.

While serving as president of the Yosemite concession, he was active as a Stanford supporter, raising funds and serving as co-chair of the 50th anniversary celebration. In 1942 he became president of the Stanford board of trustees. When Stanford president Ray Lyman Wilbur retired, he took over as president.

He served as president of Stanford from 1943 until 1948 and brought the school through the difficult years of World War II. He often said that his main job at Stanford was fundraising for the school. Tresidder set up a professional fundraising organization and streamlined administrative and accounting practices. He established a scholarship program and upgraded the music program to a full department. Tresidder also abolished the sorority system on campus in 1944, after female students voted to support the move, saying there was "serious disunity" between women who pledged sororities and women who lived in dormitories.

Tresidder also helped establish the Stanford Research Institute. The organization's first director, William F. Talbot, was initially instructed by Tresidder to avoid work that would conflict with the university's interests, particularly federal contracts that might attract political pressure. The drive to find work and the lack of support from Stanford University faculty caused the new research institute to violate this directive six months later through the pursuit of a contract with the Office of Naval Research. As a result, Talbot was fired and replaced by Jesse Hobson, who had previously led the Armour Research Foundation, but the pursuit of contract work remained.

Tresidder died of a heart attack at The St. Regis Hotel in New York City on January 28, 1948, while on University business.

Recognition

 Tresidder Peak in Yosemite National Park is named for him. 
 The Tresidder Memorial Union at Stanford University, dedicated in 1962, is named for him.
 The Tresidder Bollards, also at Stanford University, are named for him.
 The Ahwahnee Hotel in Yosemite has a Mary Curry Tresidder suite and an Underwood/Tresidder suite which incorporates the Tresidder Library.

References

Further reading
 Edwin Kiester, Jr., Donald Tresidder: Stanford's Overlooked Treasure (Stanford Historical Society, 1992)
 Shirley Sargent, Yosemite’s Innkeepers (1975, 2000).

1894 births
1948 deaths
Presidents of Stanford University
Stanford University alumni
People from Tipton, Indiana
Stanford University School of Medicine alumni
American people of Cornish descent
SRI International people
Stanford University trustees
20th-century American academics